Susquehanna County is  a county in the Commonwealth of Pennsylvania. It is part of Northeastern Pennsylvania. As of the 2020 census, the population was 38,434 Its county seat is Montrose. The county was created on February 21, 1810, from part of Luzerne County and later organized in 1812. It is named for the Susquehanna River.

History

Settlement and conflict
The first non-Indigenous settlers began to move into the area from Philadelphia and Connecticut in the mid-1700s. At the time, the area was part of Luzerne County. As more and more people from Connecticut moved in, there began to be some conflict. Under Connecticut's land grant, they owned everything from present-day Connecticut to the Pacific Ocean. This meant their land grant overlapped with Pennsylvania's land grant. Soon fighting began – the 1769–1799 Pennamite–Yankee Wars. In the end, the government of Connecticut surrendered its claim on the area.

Formation
In 1810, Susquehanna County was formed out of Luzerne County and later in 1812, Montrose was made the county seat.

Coal and early prosperity
After the Civil War, coal started to be mined. Following this, railways and roads were built into the county allowing for more people to come. At one point the county had nearly 50,000 people. Coal became, as with neighboring counties, the backbone of the economy. This boom in coal would allow for an age of prosperity in the county.

Great Depression
When the Great Depression hit, the coal industry suffered horribly. Within months, the coal industry was struggling. During World War II, the coal industry picked up again, but only for a short time. Soon after, the economy in the county failed. Many mines were closed, railways were torn apart, and the economy took a turn for the worse. Unemployment rose and population decline increased.

Geography

Susquehanna County is very mountainous, with large concentrations of mountains in the east and smaller, more hill-like mountains in the west. The highest mountain in the county is North Knob just west of Union Dale. Most people live in one of the several long and mostly narrow valleys. These valleys are good farming land.

The county has a warm-summer humid continental climate (Dfb) and average monthly temperatures in Montrose range from 21.2 °F in January to 67.7 °F in July.

Adjacent counties
Broome County, New York (north)
Wayne County (east)
Lackawanna County (southeast)
Wyoming County (southwest)
Bradford County (west)
Tioga County, New York (northwest)

Demographics

As of the census of 2000, there were 42,238 people, 16,529 households, and 11,785 families residing in the county. The population density was 51 people per square mile (20/km2). There were 21,829 housing units at an average density of 26 per square mile (10/km2). The racial makeup of the county was 98.54% White, 0.30% Black or African American, 0.15% Native American, 0.22% Asian, 0.01% Pacific Islander, 0.17% from other races, and 0.60% from two or more races. 0.67% of the population were Hispanic or Latino of any race. 26% were of English, 16.1% were of German, 15.1% Irish, 8.6% Italian and 7.7% Polish ancestry.

There were 16,529 households, out of which 31.90% had children under the age of 18 living with them, 57.70% were married couples living together, 8.60% had a female householder with no husband present, and 28.70% were non-families. 24.30% of all households were made up of individuals, and 11.50% had someone living alone who was 65 years of age or older. The average household size was 2.53 and the average family size was 2.99.

In the county, the population was spread out, with 25.50% under the age of 18, 6.70% from 18 to 24, 27.10% from 25 to 44, 25.20% from 45 to 64, and 15.50% who were 65 years of age or older. The median age was 40 years. For every 100 females, there were 98.90 males. For every 100 females age 18 and over, there were 95.80 males.

2020 Census

Politics

|}

As of January 9, 2023, there are 27,049 registered voters in Susquehanna County.
 Republican: 16,538 (61.1%)
 Democratic: 6,856 (25.4%)
 Independent: 2,385 (8.8%)
 Third Party: 1,270 (4.7%)

County Commissioners
Judith Herschel, Democrat (January 2020 to present)
Alan M. Hall, Chair, Republican (January 2012 to present)
Elizabeth M. Arnold, Vice-Chair, Republican (January 2016)

Row Offices
Clerk of Courts and Prothonotary, Jan Krupinski, Republican
Coroner, Tony Conarton, Republican
District Attorney, Marion O'Malley, Republican 
Recorder of Deeds and Register of Wills, Michelle Estabrook, Republican
Sheriff, Lance Benedict, Republican
Treasurer, Jason Miller, Republican
Auditor, George Starzec, Republican
Auditor, Susan Jennings, Democrat

State Representatives
Tina Pickett, Republican (110th district) - Apolacon, Auburn, Dimock, Forest Lake, Jessup, Middletown, and Rush Townships, and Little Meadows Borough
Jonathan Fritz, Republican (111th district) - Ararat, Bridgewater, Brooklyn, Choconut, Clifford, Franklin, Gibson, Great Bend, Harford, Harmony, Herrick, Jackson, Lathrop, Lenox, Liberty, New Milford, Oakland, Silver Lake, Springville, and Thompson Townships, and Friendsville, Great Bend, Hallstead, Hop Bottom, Lanesboro, Montrose, New Milford, Oakland, Susquehanna Depot, Thompson, and Union Dale Boroughs

State Senators
Lisa Baker, Republican (20th district) - Ararat, Auburn, Brooklyn, Clifford, Gibson, Great Bend, Harford, Harmony, Herrick, Jackson, Lathrop, Lenox, New Milford, Oakland, Springville, and Thompson Townships, and Forest City, Great Bend, Hallstead, Hop Bottom, Lanesboro, New Milford, Oakland, Susquehanna Depot, Thompson, and Union Dale Boroughs
Gene Yaw, Republican (23rd district) - Apolacon, Bridgewater, Choconut, Dimock, Forest Lake, Franklin, Jessup, Liberty, Middletown, Rush and Silver Lake Townships, and Friendsville, Little Meadows, and Montrose Boroughs

U.S. Representative
Dan Meuser, Republican (PA-09)

United States Senate
 Bob Casey Jr.,  Democrat
 John Fetterman, Democrat

Economy
The economy in the county is mainly made up of retail, health care industry, public school employment, small businesses, and government officials.

Major employers
2018
Listed in order of number of employees at the end of 2018, according to the Pennsylvania Department of Labor and Industry May 2019 monthly report:
Montrose Area School District 
Barnes-Kasson County Hospital
Pennsylvania State Government
Endless Mountains Health Systems
Susquehanna County government
Mountain View School District 
Elk Lake School District
Gassearch Drilling Services Corp
Blue Ridge School District
Cabot Oil & Gas Corporation

2015
Barnes-Kasson County Hospital
Montrose Area School District 
Endless Mountains Health Systems
C & G Construction Inc
Elk Lake School District
Susquehanna County government
Mountain View School District 
Pennsylvania State Government
Gassearch Drilling Services Corp
Blue Ridge School District

2014
Montrose Area School District
Barnes-Kasson County Hospital
Gassearch Drilling Services Corp
Endless Mountains Health Systems
Elk Lake School District
Blue Ridge School District
Susquehanna County government
Mountain View School District
Elk Mountain Ski Resort INC
Forest City Regional School District

Natural gas
Since unconventional drilling for natural gas began in 2008, some say the economy has improved.  According to the U.S. Bureau of Labor Statistics, the unemployment rate in Susquehanna County was 6.1 percent in January 2008. It has since fluctuated between a high of 11.1 percent and a low of 3.1 percent. As of January 2018, the unemployment rate was 5.7 percent. After decades of population growth since the 1950s, the population in Susquehanna County has since begun to decline, concurrent with the expansion of natural gas drilling and accompanying infrastructure. Between 2010 and 2016, there was an estimated population decline of 5.8 percent. As of 2011, there were 1,079 active natural gas wells in the county which had collectively been issued 795 notices of violations by the Department of Environmental Protection of Pennsylvania.

Tourism
Susquehanna County's natural environment, skiing, and small villages make it a growing tourist destination.

Education

Public libraries
 Susquehanna County Historical Society & Free Library Association
 Pratt Memorial Library
 Forest City Library
 Hallstead Public Library
 Hallstead-Great Bend Library
 Susquehanna Free Library

Public school districts
 Blue Ridge School District (New Milford)
 Elk Lake School District (Dimock) (also in Wyoming County)
 Forest City Regional School District (Forest City) (also in Lackawanna and Wayne Counties)
 Montrose Area School District (Montrose)
 Mountain View School District (Kingsley)
 Susquehanna Community School District (also in Wayne County)

Vocational schools
Susquehanna County Career and Technology Center (Dimock Township)

Intermediate unit
Luzerne Intermediate Unit 18
Northeast Intermediate Unit 19 (NEIU 19)

Private schools
Faith Mountain Christian Academy (New Milford)

Transportation

Major Highways

Rail
Susquehanna County's last mainline passenger train services, through New Milford and Hallstead, ended in January 1970. Since then, freight trains (presently Norfolk Southern) use the railroad line.

Air
Although Susquehanna County boasts several airstrips, they are strictly recreational. The closest main airports are in Binghamton, New York and Scranton, Pennsylvania.

Recreation
There is one Pennsylvania state park in Susquehanna County:
Salt Springs State Park is 7 miles (11 km) north of Montrose, just off Pennsylvania Route 29.

Communities

Under Pennsylvania law, there are four types of incorporated municipalities: cities, boroughs, townships, and, in two cases at most, towns. The following boroughs and townships are located in Susquehanna County:

Boroughs

Forest City
Friendsville
Great Bend
Hallstead
Hop Bottom
Lanesboro
Little Meadows
Montrose (county seat)
New Milford
Oakland
Susquehanna Depot
Thompson
Union Dale

Townships

Apolacon
Ararat
Auburn
Bridgewater
Brooklyn
Choconut
Clifford
Dimock
Forest Lake
Franklin
Gibson
Great Bend
Harford
Harmony
Herrick
Jackson
Jessup
Lathrop
Lenox
Liberty
Middletown
New Milford
Oakland
Rush
Silver Lake
Springville
Thompson

Population ranking
The population ranking of the following table is based on the 2010 census of Susquehanna County.

† county seat

See also
National Register of Historic Places listings in Susquehanna County, Pennsylvania
 Woodbourne Forest and Wildlife Preserve

References

External links

 
1812 establishments in Pennsylvania
Counties of Appalachia
Populated places established in 1812